Donnette Jé-Michelle Snow (born March 20, 1980) is a retired American professional basketball player who played most recently in the Turkish Women's Basketball League.

High school career
Born and raised in Pensacola, Florida, Snow led Pensacola High School to the state championship and was named "Miss Basketball" in 1998. Snow was named a WBCA All-American. She participated in the WBCA High School All-America Game

College career
Snow was a psychology major at the University of Tennessee. She played alongside Tennessee graduates like Kara Lawson. On November 30, 2000, Snow became just the third woman in NCAA college basketball history to dunk during a game. She did so against the University of Illinois, University of South Carolina and Vanderbilt University.

College statistics

Source

USA Basketball
She competed with USA Basketball as a member of the 2000 Jones Cup Team that won the Gold in Taipei.

Snow was named to the National Team representing the US at the 2006 World Championships, held in Barueri and São Paulo, Brazil. The team won eight of their nine contests, but the lone loss came in the semifinal medal round to Russia. The USA beat Brazil in the final game to earn the bronze medal. Snow averaged 2.8 points per game and was second on the team with six blocks.

WNBA career
Snow was drafted 10th overall by the Houston Comets in the 1st round of the 2002 WNBA Draft. Her nickname is "Shell". Snow has a 7'1"  reach which helped her to become one of the best shot blockers in the WNBA.

In 2003, Snow was named most improved player of the year.

In the 2006 WNBA all-star game, Snow became the second WNBA player to dunk in an all-star game.

After the Comets disbanded in late 2008, she later played for the Atlanta Dream. She was traded to the San Antonio Silver Stars on March 11, 2010. She was again traded to the Chicago Sky on April 20, 2011. Snow signed with the Washington Mystics on February 9, 2012. On September 9, 2015, Snow signed with the Los Angeles Sparks for the rest of the season, only playing two games of the Sparks' season. She has been a free agent in the league since the end of the 2015 season.

NWBL career
Snow played on the championship team of the 2003 Houston Stealth in the NWBL.

Overseas career
She played for Elitzur Ramla in Israel during the 2007–08 WNBA off-season, winning a championship with the team. She had been playing for Salamanca in Spain during the 2008–09 WNBA off-season. During the 2009–2012 off-seasons she played for Dynamo Kursk in the Russian Superleague A, winning a EuroCup with the team in 2012.

In the 2014–2015 WNBA off-season, Snow played in the Turkish Superleague for Mersin Büyükşehir Belediyesi. In May 2016, Snow re-signed with Mersin Büyükşehir Belediyesi for the 2016–17 WNBA off-season. For the 2017–2018 season, which she announced would be her last, Snow first played at Bornova Becker (Turkey – KBSL) before moving to Adana ASKI Mersin in the same league, where she earned honorable mention for the All-League Teams.

Notes

External links
WNBA Player Profile

1980 births
Living people
American expatriate basketball people in Israel
American expatriate basketball people in Spain
American women's basketball players
Atlanta Dream players
Basketball players from Florida
Centers (basketball)
Chicago Sky players
Houston Comets players
Power forwards (basketball)
San Antonio Stars players
Sportspeople from Pensacola, Florida
Tennessee Lady Volunteers basketball players
Washington Mystics players
Women's National Basketball Association All-Stars
United States women's national basketball team players